I Walk Alone may refer to:

Films
I Walk Alone, a 1947 film noir

Music
"I Walk Alone" (Marty Robbins song), a 1968 number one country music song by Marty Robbins
"I Walk Alone" (Tarja song), released in 2007 by Tarja
"I Walk Alone" (Cher song), a 2013 song by Cher from Closer to the Truth.
"I Walk Alone", from the 1995 Carnival of Souls: The Final Sessions studio album by Kiss
"I Walk Alone", a 1999 song by the post-grunge band Oleander, appearing on the album February Son
"I Walk Alone", a song by Saliva on the 2006 WWE Wreckless Intent compilation album, as Batista's entrance theme.
"I Walk Alone", a 2008 song on The Crucible of Man: Something Wicked Part 2 by Iced Earth
"I Walk Alone", a song by Raw Solution, used as the entrance theme for German wrestler John "Bad Bones" Klinger (2014 - current)

See also
"Boulevard of Broken Dreams" (Green Day song), sometimes misinterpreted as "I Walk Alone"
"I'll Walk Alone", a 1944 song